The 2019–20 EuroCup Women was the eighteenth edition of FIBA Europe's second-tier international competition for women's basketball clubs under such name.

On 16 June 2020, FIBA Europe announced the season was declared void and would not be finished due to the COVID-19 pandemic.

Teams
Teams were confirmed by FIBA Europe on 17 June 2019.

Schedule

Qualification round

|}

Group stage
Draw for the group stage was made on 23 July 2019 in Munich, Germany.

Conference 1

Group A

Group B

Group C

Group D

Group E

Conference 2

Group F

Group G

Group H

Group I

Group J

Ranking of third-placed teams

Conference 1

Conference 2

Seeding

Play-offs

Bracket

See also
 2019–20 EuroLeague Women

References

External links
 EuroCup Women website

EuroCup Women seasons
2019–20 in European women's basketball leagues
EuroCup Women